Star of South Africa may refer to:

 Star of South Africa (diamond)
 Order of the Star of South Africa, a South African order
 Star of South Africa, Gold, a military decoration
 Star of South Africa, Grand Cross, a civil decoration
 Star of South Africa, Silver, a military decoration
 Star of South Africa (1952), a military decoration